Femöre battery (Femörefortet) is a facility previously operated by the Swedish Coastal Artillery arm of Swedish Armed Forces. Also known as "Battery OD", it is located only a short trip south-east of Oxelösund on the Swedish east coast, and is blasted into the rock on the Femöre peninsula.

The battery was part of a series of similar facilities built during the 1960s and 1970s as a defence against potential attacks from the Soviet Union. Battery OD was the third of a total of 30 forts built in Sweden during the Cold War.
The Femöre battery was decommissioned in 1997, and was scheduled for dismantling in 2003. Due to a local interest group, large parts of the fort were instead preserved and is today used as a museum. Since 2003, the battery has been open for regular tours during the summer.

References

External links

Femörefortet society
Subterranea Britannica

Forts in Sweden
Military and war museums in Sweden
Museums in Södermanland County
Naval history of Sweden
Coastal artillery
Cold War